Section 44 Records is an independent record label and online store based in Colorado and specializing in electronic music and related genres. In 2004, Section 44 Records was formed by Pierre Norman and Randall Erkelens from the band Tristraum. Section 44 acquired the synthpop forum Sloth Radio and defunct label Kiss My Asterix Records. The label has released albums, singles, and compilations by The Alphabet Girls, Leiahdorus, Eight to Infinity, Eloquent, Empire State Human, Tristraum, and Tycho Brahe. Although based in the U.S., the roster includes international bands. Section 44 Records added Breye Kiser of Provision and Steven Cochran of Eloquent, and Royal Visionaries to its management and A&R in 2005.

Discography
 
 Eloquent: Carousel of Life – Catalog # SEC-019 
 Royal Visionaries: Analogue Fairytale – Catalog # SEC-018
 Sector One: Vol 2 – Various Artist Compilation – Catalog # SEC-017
 Storybox: No Dancing Allowed – Catalog # SEC-016
 Tycho Brahe: Transatlantic – The Atlantic Remixes – Catalog # SEC-015
 Chinese Theatre: Voices & Machines – Catalog # SEC-014
 Fake the Envy: Blind – Catalog # SEC-013
 Eloquent: Carousel of Life (Limited Edition E.P.) – Catalog # SEC-012
 New Music Sampler: Various Artist Compilation – Catalog # SEC-011
 Rhythmic Symphony: The Mechanism Fulfilled – Catalog # SEC-010
 Sector One: Various Artist Compilation – Catalog # SEC-009
 Eight to Infinity: Aether – Catalog # SEC-008
 Tristraum: Gray – Catalog # SEC-007
 Tristraum: First Embrace MCD – Catalog # SEC-006
 Provision: The Consequence – Catalog # SEC-005
 Provision: Ideal Warfare MCD – Catalog # SEC-004
 4x4: Volume Two – Catalog # SEC-003
 The Fixx: An Electronic Tribute – Catalog # SEC-002
 Rocket: A Tribute to Dead or Alive – Catalog # SEC-001
 Eloquent: Future pop – Catalog # WSR01
 Royal Visionaries: Back to Yazoo – The Remix E.P. – Catalog # WSR02
 Spanky: Dominatricks 12" Vinyl – Catalog # TW-EP–08
 Empire State Human: Cycles – Catalog # KMA
 Jaded: Various Artist Compilation – Catalog # KMA
 Cosmicity: Definitive CD/DVD KMA
 The Alphabet Girls: Beatnik Europa KMA
 Electrokuted!: An electronic tribute to the Gods of Metal and Rock. KMA
 Tristraum: Shiver 12" Vinyl MHHP-EP–03
 Tristraum: Shiver MCD INT–0130
 4x4: Volume One KMA-SOO4

See also 
 List of electronic music record labels

References

External links 
 Official site

American independent record labels
Synth-pop record labels
Electronic music record labels